Carcharodontosauridae (carcharodontosaurids; from the Greek καρχαροδοντόσαυρος, carcharodontósauros: "shark-toothed lizards") is a group of carnivorous theropod dinosaurs. In 1931, Ernst Stromer named Carcharodontosauridae as a family, which, in modern paleontology,  indicates a clade within Carnosauria. Carcharodontosaurids include some of the largest land predators ever known: Giganotosaurus, Mapusaurus, Carcharodontosaurus, and Tyrannotitan all rivaled or exceeded Tyrannosaurus in size.

Evolution

Along with the spinosaurids, carcharodontosaurids were the largest predators in the early and middle Cretaceous throughout Gondwana, with species also present in North America (Acrocanthosaurus), Europe (Concavenator) and Asia (Shaochilong). Carcharodontosaurids range throughout the Cretaceous from the Barremian (127-121 million years ago) to the Turonian (93-89 million years ago). Past the Turonian, they were replaced by the smaller abelisaurids in Gondwana and by tyrannosaurids in North America and Asia. While some teeth and a maxilla discovered in Maastrichtian deposits of Brazil. this identification has been subsequently rejected and the material assigned to abelisaurids after better examination, and there are no reliable records of carcharodontosaurs in South America beyond the end of the Turonian. In December 2011, Oliver W. M. Rauhut described a new genus and species of carcharodontosaurid from the Late Jurassic (late Kimmeridgian to earliest Tithonian faunal stage, about 154-150 million years ago) of Tendaguru Formation, southeastern Tanzania. This genus, Veterupristisaurus represents the oldest known carcharodontosaurid.

Classification

The family Carcharodontosauridae was originally named by Ernst Stromer in 1931 to include the single newly discovered species Carcharodontosaurus saharicus. A close relative of C. saharicus, Giganotosaurus, was added to the family when it was described in 1995. Additionally, many paleontologists have included Acrocanthosaurus in this family (Sereno et al. 1996, Harris 1998, Holtz 2000, Rauhut 2003, Eddy & Clarke, 2011, Rauhut 2011), though others place it in the related family Allosauridae (Currie & Carpenter, 2000; Coria & Currie, 2002). Carcharodontosaurids are characterized by the following morphological characters : Dorsoventral depth of anterior maxillary interdental plates more than twice anteroposterior width, squared, sub-rectangular anterior portion of the dentary, teeth with wrinkled enamel surfaces, presence of four premaxillary alveoli and a premaxillary body taller than long in lateral aspect, opisthocoelous cervical vertebrae with neural spines more than 1.9 times the height of the centrum, large, textured rugosities on the lacrimal and postorbital formed by roofing and forming broad orbital shelves, and a proximomedially inclined femoral head.
With the discovery of Mapusaurus in 2006, Rodolfo Coria and Phil Currie erected a subfamily of Carcharodontosauridae, the Giganotosaurinae, to contain the most advanced South American species, which they found to be more closely related to each other than to the African and European forms. Coria and Currie did not formally refer Tyrannotitan to this subfamily, pending a more detailed description of that genus, but noted that based on characteristics of the femur, it may be a gigantosaurine as well.

In 1998 Paul Sereno defined Carcharodontosauridae as a clade, consisting of Carcharodontosaurus and all species closer to it than to either Allosaurus, Sinraptor, Monolophosaurus, or Cryolophosaurus. Therefore, this clade is by definition outside of the clade Allosauridae. 
The cladogram below follows the analysis of Brusatte et al., 2009.

Cladogram after Ortega et al., 2010

Cladogram after Novas et al., 2013

Cladogram after Canale et al., 2022

The placement of Acrocanthosaurus is unclear, with most researchers favoring Carcharodontosauridae and others favoring Allosauridae. In 2011, a redescription of Kelmayisaurus by Stephen L. Brusatte, Roger B. J. Benson and Xing Xu found it to be valid genus of Carcharodontosauridae. A phylogenetic analysis of Tetanurae recovered K. petrolicus as a basal carcharodontosaurid in a trichotomy with Eocarcharia and a clade comprising more derived carcharodontosaurids. Bahariasaurus has also been proposed as a carcharodontosaurid, but its remains are too scarce to be certain.

Carcharodontosaurids have been proposed as more closely related to abelisaurids, as opposed to the allosaurids. This is due to these two clades sharing some cranial features. However, these similarities appear to derive from parallel evolution between these two groups. A larger number of cranial and postcranial characters support their relationship with allosaurids.

Paleobiology

Growth 
Studies of the Argentinian taxon Meraxes suggest that these allosauroids were slow-growing, taking as long as 30-40 years to reach maturity. The maximum age for the holotype specimen was estimated to be roughly 50 years at the time of its death, making it the oldest known non-avian theropod. Unlike Tyrannosaurus, to which its growth has been compared, this carcharodontosaurid was revealed to have kept growing throughout its life.

In 2021 the paleontologist Andrea Cau proposed that Scipionyx, formally classified as a compsognathid, was instead an hatchling carcharodontosaurid. He compared it with Allosaurus and Acrocanthosaurus, finding it more similar to the carcharodontosaurid than the allosaurid.

References

External links

Carcharodontosauridae/Abelisauridae
Carcharodontosauridae/Abelisauridae 2

 
Carcharodontosauria
Kimmeridgian first appearances
Turonian extinctions
Prehistoric dinosaur families